Rachel Cooper might refer to:

Rachel Cooper (philosopher) (born 1974), British philosopher
Rachel Cooper (presenter) (born 1954), American arts presenter
Rachel Cooper (soccer) (born 1989), Australian football player